William Irvin Swoope (October 3, 1862 – October 9, 1930) was a Republican member of the U.S. House of Representatives from Pennsylvania.

Swoope was born in Clearfield, Pennsylvania.  He attended The Hill School in Pottstown, PA and Phillips Academy in Andover, Massachusetts, and graduated from the law department of Harvard University in 1886.  He was admitted to the bar in 1886, and practiced law in Minnesota, Nebraska, and Bellefonte, Pennsylvania.  He was elected burgess of Bellefonte.  In 1892, he returned to Clearfield and continued the practice of law.  He was elected county chairman and district attorney for Clearfield County from 1901 to 1907.  He was a delegate to the 1916 Republican National Convention.  He served as deputy attorney general for Pennsylvania from 1919 to 1923.

Swoope was elected as a Republican to the sixty-eighth and Sixty-ninth Congresses.  He served as Chairman of the United States House Committee on Invalid Pensions during the Sixty-ninth Congress.  He declined to be a candidate for renomination in 1926.  He resumed the practice of law in Clearfield until his death.  Interment in Hillcrest Cemetery.

He was the nephew of U.S. Representative John Patton from Pennsylvania.

Sources

The Political Graveyard

External links 
 

1862 births
1930 deaths
Phillips Academy alumni
The Hill School alumni
Minnesota lawyers
Nebraska lawyers
Pennsylvania lawyers
Harvard Law School alumni
Republican Party members of the United States House of Representatives from Pennsylvania
People from Clearfield, Pennsylvania